Muhammad Noor (1925 – 9 June 2000) was an Indian footballer. He competed in the men's tournament at the 1956 Summer Olympics.

Playing career
In club football, Noor appeared with Hyderabad City Police FC, then one of the strongest sides in Indian football.

He later represented India national team, managed by Syed Abdul Rahim.

Honours

India
Asian Games Gold medal: 1951
 Colombo Cup: 1954

Hyderabad
Santosh Trophy: 1956–57, 1957–58

References

External links
 

1925 births
2000 deaths
Indian footballers
India international footballers
Olympic footballers of India
Footballers at the 1952 Summer Olympics
Footballers at the 1956 Summer Olympics
Footballers from Hyderabad, India
Association football midfielders
Footballers at the 1951 Asian Games
Footballers at the 1954 Asian Games
Footballers at the 1958 Asian Games
Medalists at the 1951 Asian Games
Asian Games gold medalists for India
Asian Games medalists in football